Bethan Forrow (born 4 May 2001) is a British slalom canoeist who has competed at the international level since 2016.

She won a gold medal in the C1 team event at the 2018 ICF Canoe Slalom World Championships in Rio de Janeiro as well as a gold medal in the same event at the 2018 European Championships in Prague.

References

External links

Living people
English female canoeists
2001 births
Medalists at the ICF Canoe Slalom World Championships
People from Hatfield, Hertfordshire